Street Woman Fighter, often abbreviated as SWF, is the debut season of a South Korean dance competition franchise of the same name. It premiered on Mnet on August 24, 2021, and aired every Tuesday at 22:20 KST before concluding on October 26, 2021. It revolved around eight female dance crews fighting for the position of Korea's best female dance crew to represent street dance in the country (loosely marketed under the term 'K-dance'). The winning crew (HolyBang) received  million, a sponsorship deal with Budweiser, and the Street Woman Fighter trophy. The season would later be followed by a second season, Street Man Fighter, of the same premise though with male contestants.

Judge panel, presenters and guests 
The program is presented by Kang Daniel.

The judge panel in this season consists of three dancers from SM Entertainment:
 BoA
 Taeyong (NCT)
 Hwang Sang-hoon

Special guests

"4 Legends of K-pop" mission (episode 4) 
 Hyuna
 CL
 Jessi
 Psy

"Mega Crew" mission (episodes 5–6) 
 Sooyoung (Girls' Generation)
 Choi Yoo-jung (Weki Meki)
 Yves (Loona)
 Lee Young-ji (solo)
 Byun Yo-han (Video Appearance)

"Jessi Choreography" mission (episode 7) 
 Jessi
 Psy

"Men of Women" Mission (episodes 7–8) 
 Jay Park
 Jo Kwon (2AM)

"Performance Sound Source" mission (episode 9) 
 CL
 Sunmi
 Simon Dominic
 Loco
 Chungha

Street Woman Fighter: Gala Talkshow (special episodes) 
Haha
Jang Do-yeon

Contestants 

Color key:
  Leader

Episodes

Exclusive preview (August 18, 2021)
Released on the Mnet TV YouTube channel on August 18, 2021. All participating crews are introduced while they enter into their separate rooms. Each crew produces a personal ranking of all participating crews which is shown to each crew. Each crew are called to the main lobby where they are shown a video of their impressions from other participating crews and then seated at their designated area. Each dancer also selects the person that they think is the weakest dancer, and the selected person receives a "No Respect" Sticker.

The exclusive preview ends with a preview of the first episode where Kang Daniel explains the first mission; various dance battle previews can be seen along with reactions from Kang Daniel, the participants, and the judges.

Episode 1 (August 24, 2021)
The first part of the episode is the same as the exclusive preview with the introductions of the crews, personal rankings, impression videos, and "No Respect" selection.

Kang Daniel introduces the judges and explains the first mission, Battle of the Underdog: a dance battle between two participants where one calls out another they think they are better than. The episode ends with the a preview of the battle between HolyBang leader Honey J and CocaNButter leader Rihey, who used to be in the same dance crew but disbanded.

Episode 2 (August 31, 2021)
The first mission continues starting with a battle between LACHICA's Rian and WAYB leader Noze. YGX and CocaNButter were tied with the same amount of wins in the final rankings and so YGX leader Leejung had a tiebreaker battle against CocaNButter's Bicki in which YGX was ultimately declared the winner of the first mission. They were given access to the penthouse as the prize.

The second mission, the Rank Mission, was announced: each leader select five dancers including themselves to represent their crew in each rank (Leader Rank, Second Rank, Sub Rank, Assist Rank). Each rank would only have one main dancer, chosen by the judges while the rest will be backup dancers. Each member of each rank made a short choreography to be used in the main dancer evaluation which was voted on by the members of the rank. The main dancer evaluation begins with the Assist Rank in which PROWDMON's HYEILY was chosen. The episode ends with the Leader Rank evaluation with WAYB's NOZE being chosen.

Episode 3 (September 7, 2021)
The second mission continues starting with the main dancer evaluation for the Sub rank. Instead of one dancer from each team, there are two and both members from one team will be the main dancers. WANT's Emma and Moana were selected as the main dancers. LACHICA's Rian is chosen as main dancer for the Second rank. The choreography video recording is then shown for each rank followed by the choreography video itself. After the choreography video is shown, the main dancer then picks the Worst Dancer in their rank. The chosen Worst Dancers are: PROWDMON's Monika from the Leader Rank, HolyBang's Jane from the Second Rank, YGX's Jihyo and Yeojin from the Sub Rank, and HOOK's Yoonkyung Seon from the Assist Rank.

The chosen Worst Dancers can choose another dancer in their rank who they think is the Worst Dancer to battle, excluding the Main Dancer. The loser, chosen by the remaining dancers, becomes the Worst Dancer for their rank. The chosen battlers are: HolyBang's Honey J from the Leader Rank, WAYB's Leesu from the Second Rank, HOOK's Born and Hyowoo from the Sub Ranks, and WANT's Lee Chaeyeon from the Assist Class. The final Worst Dancers are: HolyBang's Honey J, WAYB's Leesu, YGX's Yeojin and Jihyo, and WANT's Lee Chaeyeon.

The third mission was announced as the 4 Queens of K-Pop Mission where two crews will battle against each other using the same songs. PROWDMON was chosen by the judges as the MVP Crew and thus are allowed to create the matchup bracket for the third mission, choosing which crews battle each other with whose song. It was also announced that a crew will be eliminated after the next mission.

Episode 4 (September 14, 2021)
The third mission begins with a showdown between PROWDMON and WAYB with a special video evaluation appearance from CL, whose songs the two crews are using. The performance videos are shown and the fight judges' scores are revealed with PROWDMON coming out on top. The next battle is between CocaNButter and HOOK who are performing to Hyuna's songs. HOOK wins this round. The next battle is between LACHICA and HolyBang, performing to Jessi's song with a special video evaluation appearance of the latter and Psy. LACHICA wins. The last battle is between YGX and WANT performing to fight judge BoA's songs. YGX wins. After all the fight judges' scores are revealed, the final score is calculated with the Global Popular Vote Score and the Main Dancer and Worst Dancer scores from the last mission. YGX, PROWDMON, LACHICA, and HOOK win their matchup while WANT, WAYB, HolyBang, and CocaNButter are up for elimination.

It is announced that two teams will battle it out with the loser being eliminated. CocaNButter is automatically placed in the battle having the lowest overall score. The second team is chosen by YGX, who had the highest overall score. WANT cannot be chosen and is safe from elimination because they had the highest scores among those who lost. YGX chooses WAYB.

CocaNButter faces off against WAYB in a best-of-five dance battle in a similar style to the first mission. CocaNButter comes out on top and WAYB is eliminated.

Episode 5 (September 28, 2021)
The episode starts with the 7 surviving crews enjoying a pool party on the penthouse. Afterwards, each crew went to their respective hideout where the fourth mission, the Mega Crew Mission, is introduced. Each crew will create and perform a choreography with a minimum of 25 performers who must be recruited personally by each crew. Weki Meki's Choi Yoo-jung, Loona's Yves, and Lee Young-ji appear as guest performers with WANT. Girls' Generation's Sooyoung appears as a guest performer with HOOK.

The performances and Judges' scores of LACHICA, HolyBang, CocaNButter, PROWDMON, and HOOK were shown in this episode.

Episode 6 (October 5, 2021)
The Mega Crew Mission continues with the performances and Judges' scores for YGX and WANT being revealed. The Global Popular Vote Scores for all the crews are revealed and added to their Judges' scores to calculate the final scores. HolyBang wins this mission with the highest overall score. The three crews with the lowest scores, LACHICA, CocaNButter, and WANT, are nominated for elimination.

It is announced that two teams will battle it out with the loser being eliminated. LACHICA is automatically placed in the battle having the lowest overall score. The second team is chosen by HolyBang, who had the highest overall score. HolyBang chooses WANT.

LACHICA faces off against WANT in a best-of-seven dance battle. After an intense battle, LACHICA comes out on top and WANT is eliminated.

The next mission, the P Nation Choreography Mission, is revealed in which each crew will make a choreography for P Nation artist Jessi's new song "Cold Blooded". Jessi makes a guest appearance to announce the song.

Episode 7 (October 12, 2021)
The semifinal round is revealed to be 2 missions which scores will be combined. It is also revealed that only 4 crews will be in the finals, meaning that 2 crews will be eliminated for this round.

The first mission is the Jessi Choreography Mission. Each crew will make a choreography for Jessi's new single "Cold Blooded" and Jessi and Psy will pick the best choreography. Each team's choreography is shown and Jessi and Psy pick YGX's choreography as the best one. YGX will receive extra points and will have to opportunity to direct the music video. All crews participate in the music video.

The second mission is the Men of Women Mission, where each crew must recruit male dancers and create a mixed choreography. 2AM's Jo Kwon appears as a guest dancer with LACHICA. Jay Park appears as a guest dancer with HolyBang.

The performances and Judges' scores of LACHICA, HOOK, and CocaNButter were shown in this episode.

Episode 8 (October 19, 2021)
The Men of Women Mission continues with the performances and Judges' scores for HolyBang, PROWDMON and YGX being revealed.

The Global Popular Vote Scores for all the crews are revealed and added to their Judges' scores in addition to the Jessi Choreography Mission score to calculate the final scores. HOOK, HolyBang, and CocaNButter have the three highest scores and move onto the final round. YGX and LACHICA placed 4th and 5th and were nominated for elimination. PROWDMON had the lowest score and was automatically eliminated.

LACHICA faces off against YGX in a best-of-five dance battle. After an intense battle, LACHICA comes out on top and YGX is eliminated.

The finals is revealed to be another 2 part mission, the first being the Performance Sound Source Mission, where each crew will team up with an artist and create a new choreography to the artist's song, and the second being the Color of Crew Mission, where each crew will create and perform a choreography that shows off each crew's color.

Episode 9 (October 26, 2021)
This episode is the live finale of the program competition. The finals is composed of two missions, the Performance Song Mission and the Color of Crew Mission. The winner will be decided based on the following criteria: 70% live voting + 30% Global Popular Vote. Audience members in attendance include the four crews eliminated in the previous episodes, YGX, PROWDMON, WANT, and WAYB.

The four finalist dance crews, HolyBang, HOOK, LACHICA, and CocaNButter, started the finale off with a performance to "7 Rings" by Ariana Grande.

The Performance Song Mission is the first mission to take place. In this mission, musical artists gift songs to the dance crews which will then create a performance with the song. Chungha gifted "Bad Girl" to LACHICA. CL gifted "CAVIAR" to CocaNButter. Simon Dominic and Loco gifted "NO BREAK" to HolyBang. Sunmi gifted "Too young to die" to HOOK.

In the Color of Crew Mission, each crew will create a performance that expresses the color of each crew. The performance order is LACHICA, CocaNButter, HolyBang, and finally HOOK.

All the leaders of the crews gave a special performance of "Hey Mama" by David Guetta from the Rank Mission.

During the winner's announcement, LACHICA and CocaNButter came in third and fourth respectively. HolyBang was announced as the winner leaving HOOK as runner-up.

Missions

Mission 1: "Battle of the Underdog"
Each dancer beforehand pointed out a dancer from an opposing team that they can beat in a one-on-one dance battle. The chosen dancer is given a "No Respect" Sticker for each time they are chosen.

 The named dancer points out a dancer they consider to be the weakest, and engages in a one-on-one dance battle for 40 seconds each.
 The named dancer goes first while the pointed out dancer goes second.
 At the end of the battle, the Fight Judges will determine the winner.
 Fight Judges can request a rematch when no winner can be decided. A rematch will take place if two or more judges cannot decide a winner or in the case of a 1:1 tie and the third judge cannot choose a winner. In the rematch, both dancers dance at the same time for 40 seconds.
 The winning dancer receives a gold chip for their team while the loser receives a black chip for their team
 The team with the most losses are labeled as the NO RESPECT Crew.

Color key:
  Winner

Mission 2: Ranking

Each crew leader chooses five members including themselves to be split into four ranks. Each rank will work together to create a dance video. Each rank will only have one main dancer which will be chosen by the judges. The rest will be back-up dancers in the video. Each dancer in a rank will create a short choreography which will be voted on by the members of their rank. The chosen choreography will be the one used to determine the main dancer.

In charge of the center position, choreography, and directing the video for their rank
Receive 50 points for their crew
Can designate the "worst dancer" in their rank to deduct 50 points from their crew

The worst dancer chosen by the main dancer can choose another dancer except for the main dancer in their rank that they think is the worst dancer. The chosen dancer will have a dance battle with the nominated worst dancer. At the end of the battle, all the dancers of the crews except for those of the battlers will vote for the worst dancer using a "Worst" token. The dancer with more "Worst" tokens is the worst dancer.

Color key:

Color key:
  Winner

PROWDMON was chosen as the MVP crew and will create the match-ups for the next mission.

Mission 3: "4 Queens of K-pop"
Two crews compete against each other using the same song from four "queens of K-pop", leading female solo artists: BoA, CL, Jessi, and Hyuna. Each crew must also complete the Choreography Copy Challenge.

 There are two copy challenge sections in each song
 Of the two sections, each crew must take one section and create the choreography that the other team must "copy" and incorporate into their choreography
 If both crews want the same sections, they must discuss it among themselves

The crew with the higher score for each battle wins and avoids elimination while the losing crew is nominated for elimination. Final scores are calculated as the sum of the Fight Judges' Score + Global Popular Vote Score + Main Dancer Score + Worst Dancer Score from the previous mission.

Fight Judges' Score: Total of 200 points split between both crews
Global Popular Vote Score: Voting period from July 12, 2021, at 11:30 AM KST to July 15, 2021, at 11:59 PM KST. Score calculated as Views + Likes X 100. Crews are ranked from this score and awarded points in decreasing 50 point intervals starting at 600 points for the highest score.

Color key:
  Winner

As the losing crews, WANT, WAYB, HolyBang, and CocaNButter were chosen as candidates for elimination. CocaNButter was automatically placed in the elimination battle as a result of receiving the lowest score, and Want was excluded from selection as a result of receiving the highest score out of the 4 losing crews. The crew that ranked 1st, YGX, was given the power to choose their opponent out of the remaining losing crews. WAYB was chosen as the second candidate for elimination.

 Best of 5: The first round is a crew battle and rounds 2-5 are 1 VS 1
 In the 1 VS 1 rounds, each side dances for 40 seconds separately then 40 seconds together
 At the end of each round, the fight judges determine the winner
 The first crew to win three rounds is safe from elimination, while the losing crew is eliminated.

Mission 4: "Mega Crew"
Crews will compete in a Mega Crew mission where each crew will create their own choreography and perform it with at minimum 25 performers including themselves. Crews must personally recruit their mega crew performers.

Final scores are calculated as the sum of the Fight Judges' Score + Global Popular Vote Score

 Fight Judges' Score: Each judge awards up to 100 points totaling up to 300 points.
 Global Popular Vote Score: Voting period from September 15, 2021, at 12:30 AM KST to September 17, 2021, at 12:00 PM KST. Score calculated as Views + Likes X 100. Crews are ranked from this score and awarded points starting at 700 points for the highest score.

As the 7th place team, LACHICA was automatically placed in the elimination battle. The crew that ranked 1st, HolyBang, was given the power to choose their opponent out of the remaining bottom 3 crews, WANT and CocaNButter. WANT was chosen as the second candidate for elimination.

 Best of 7: Round 1 is a team battle, round 4 is 2 VS 2, and rounds 2–3, 5-7 are 1 VS 1
 In the 1 VS 1 rounds, each side dances for 40 seconds separately then 40 seconds together
 At the end of each round, the fight judges determine the winner
 The first crew to win four rounds is safe from elimination, while the losing crew is eliminated.

Mission 5: "Jessi Choreography Mission"
Each crew will create a new choreography for Jessi's new single "Cold Blooded". The crew whose choreography is chosen by Jessi and the crew whose choreography video receives the most likes will receive 100 extra points.

Mission 6: "Men of Women"
Each crew will be joined by male dancers and must create and perform an original choreography.

Final scores are calculated as the sum of the Fight Judges' Score + Global Popular Vote Score + Jessi Choreography Mission Score from the previous mission.

 Fight Judges' Score: Each judge awards up to 100 points totaling up to 300 points.
 Global Popular Vote Score: Voting period from October 11, 2021, at 2:00 PM KST to October 14, 2021, at 12:00 AM KST. Score calculated as Views + Likes X 100. Crews are ranked from this score and awarded points starting at 700 points for the highest score.

As the lowest scoring crew, PROWDMON was automatically eliminated. YGX and LACHICA will have an elimination battle for the last spot in the finals as the 4th and 5th place crews.

 Best of 5: Round 1 is a team battle, round 4 is 2 VS 2, and rounds 2–3, 5 are 1 VS 1
 In the 1 VS 1 rounds, each side dances for 40 seconds separately then 40 seconds together
 At the end of each round, the fight judges determine the winner
 The first crew to win three rounds is safe from elimination, while the losing crew is eliminated.

Mission 7: "Performance Sound Source"
Each crew will team up with an artist and create a performance to their song.

Mission 8: "Color of Crew"
Each crew will create a performance that shows the color representing them.

Final ranking

Viewership

Awards and nominations

Spin-offs

Street Dance Girls Fighter
On November 2, 2021, Mnet dropped first teaser and confirmed that the spin-off titled Street Dance Girls Fighter where high school girls would compete to create a new dance crew was confirmed. It began airing on November 30, 2021, at 10.20pm KST, and concluded on January 4, 2022.

Be Mbitious and Be the SMF
On March 22, 2022, Mnet announced Be Mbitious which would consist of individual dancers who come together as one crew with the purpose of joining Street Man Fighter. The former show premiered on May 24, 2022. Be the SMF is a one-episode television special that preceded Street Man Fighter and aired on July 5, 2022. It announced the final eight members who will jointly make up the 'Mbitious' crew on SMF.

Anybody Can Dance
On March 23, 2022, Mnet confirmed the 8 team leaders of Street Woman Fighter will be returning with a brand new reality series. Where non-professionals with a passion for dance can apply to be a student on the program to be released on June 7, 2022.

Street Man Fighter
In the final episode of Street Dance Girls Fighter on January 4, 2022, Mnet released the first teaser to confirm season two of SWF, Street Man Fighter. The show is where male dance crews fight for the position of South Korea's best male dance crew to represent 'K-dance' to be released in August 2022.

Notes

References

External links 
 

2021 South Korean television series debuts
Dance competition television shows
Korean-language television shows
Mnet (TV channel) original programming
2021 South Korean television series endings